Cătălin Tofan (born 23 December 1969) is a Romanian retired football player. His only senior club was Oțelul Galați for which he scored 25 goals in 390 matches, being a legend of "the Steelworkers". After his retirement he was appointed as an executive at the club, position he quit in January 2010.

References

External links

1969 births
Living people
Sportspeople from Galați
Romanian footballers
Association football defenders
Liga I players
Liga II players
ASC Oțelul Galați players